Eremo di San Germano (Italian for Hermitage of San Germano) is an hermitage located in Pacentro, Province of L'Aquila (Abruzzo, Italy).

History

Architecture

References

External links

Germano
Pacentro